Tim Schels (born 28 December 1998) is a German professional footballer who plays as a defensive midfielder for the North Carolina Tar Heels.

Career
In the summer of 2020, Schels joined North Carolina Tar Heels.

References

External links
 

Living people
1998 births
People from Göppingen
Sportspeople from Stuttgart (region)
German footballers
Footballers from Baden-Württemberg
Association football midfielders
Germany youth international footballers
Regionalliga players
3. Liga players
SpVgg Unterhaching players
SV Heimstetten players
North Carolina Tar Heels men's soccer players
German expatriate footballers
German expatriate sportspeople in the United States
Expatriate soccer players in the United States